Carlisle & Finch is a manufacturer of nautical equipment founded in 1893 or 1894 in Cincinnati, Ohio, where, it still has its headquarters.  The company's main products through its entire history have been searchlights, mostly for marine applications.  It was also known for navigation beacons used by airports and  lighthouses.

In addition, it was known as a producer and innovator of electric toy trains in the early years of the company.  Other early products included electric generators (powered either by water pressure or by gasoline engine), and various electric-powered appliances.

Corporate history 
The company began as a branch office of General Electric at 182–84 Elm Street, Cincinnati, Ohio, where Robert S. Finch and Morten Carlisle were employed. Work included repairing electrical machinery, such as armatures, transformers, and arc lamps.

In 1893 or 1894 (sources differ), Carlisle and Finch purchased the shop from General Electric, intending to continue the repair business and branch out into manufacturing.  The new company was incorporated on April 17, 1897, with Carlisle serving as president. The same year, they introduced their first new products, a searchlight based on the carbon arc principle, and a toy train, which also used a carbon arc for its headlight. As the company grew, they added gasoline engines.

Carlisle sold his share of the business to Finch on August 4, 1926.  Brent S. Finch, Robert's son, was named president, and the company started concentrating entirely on its searchlight business.  After World War II, Brent R. Finch (son of Brent S.) was hired, at which point three generations of Finches were simultaneously employed by the company.  , a fourth-generation leads the company, with brothers Kurtis B. Finch and Garth S. Finch serving as president and senior vice president, respectively.

A subsidiary company, C&F Polishing, provides metal polishing and restoration services.

Toy trains 

One of Carlisle & Finch's earliest products was electric toy trains, and they were the first company to manufacture them in America. The wood and metal trains entered the marketplace .

Other American companies made toy trains before Carlisle & Finch.  Edward Ives, for example, had a factory in Plymouth, Connecticut, in 1896.  These other makers used wind-up clockworks, steam, electric batteries, or overhead wires to power the cars.  Carlisle & Finch's innovation was to use the two rails as electrical conductors although this technology had been demonstrated as early as 1851 by Thomas Hall.

In 1897, they made a train set with a 4-wheel coal mining locomotive, three coal cars, two zinc-carbon elements, and a can of chromite. The locomotive included a switch for starting and reversing, and was powerful enough to pull the three loaded cars up a grade. That same year, they also made an "electric railway with double truck car" set, with a car running on two 4-wheel trucks. Both sets included  of  gauge track.

Searchlights 

When World War I started, production was shifted entirely to searchlights, to aid the war effort.  The U.S. Government was a major purchaser, with additional large orders from Greece, Spain, Norway, and Russia.  By 1917, it was one of the few companies worldwide producing searchlights, and had supplied a large proportion of the searchlights then in use by the United States and other countries.  They produced a line of commercial searchlights, and also specialized in navy and military designs.  Units were built with  diameters, and  ranges.  Current draw was 10 to 200 amps.

The earliest models used a carbon arc for the light source.  Other companies had previously built carbon arc searchlights, but Carlisle & Finch added the innovation of mounting the carbon electrodes horizontally on the beam axis.  The tip of the positive carbon faced the reflector, maximizing the amount of light reflected, and spacing of the carbons was adjusted by motorized screw-feed mechanisms.  A manually-activated screw moved the entire mechanism forward and backward, positioning the arc at the mirror's focal point.  A pair of carbons had a lifetime of about seven hours.

The company introduced Xenon arc searchlights in the 1960s.  LED models followed in 2019.

Navigation beacons
Distinct from searchlights, Carlisle & Finch also produced rotating beacons in the DCB (Directional Code Beacon) series starting around 1950.  These project a narrow light beam.  The light rotates, causing it to appear to flash from the viewpoint of a distant observer.  These were originally used as aerodrome beacons, but in the 1990s, the U.S. Coast Guard adopted them for use in lighthouses, replacing existing Fresnel lenses.  Models included DCB-24 with a  diameter, DCB-224 with two such lights, and DCB-36 with a  diameter.

 the DCB-24 and DCB-224 were the standard optics used in landfall lights (the first lights seen when approaching the coast from the open sea). They have a nominal range of  depending on the rotation speed and whether a colored cover was installed.

Other products 

In 1897, Carlisle & Finch offered a hand-powered dynamo, capable of lighting a ten candle power, ten volt incandescent bulb, or to run several electrical toys simultaneously.

In 1912, they introduced a dynamo driven by a directly-connected gasoline motor. A belt pulley was included for driving an external load.

In 1923, a clothes dryer was introduced. The device used a wire mesh drum rotated by an electric motor. Air heated by either gas or steam was forced through the drum, with the temperature controlled by a thermostat.

Gallery of early advertisements

References

External links 
 Company web site

Toy train manufacturers
1890s establishments in Ohio
Navigational aids
Manufacturing companies established in the 19th century
Toy companies of the United States